Ebenezer Stoddard (May 6, 1785 – August 19, 1847) was a United States representative from Connecticut. He was born in Union. He attended Woodstock Academy in 1802 and in 1803 and graduated from Brown University in 1807. After studying, he was admitted to the bar in 1810 and commenced practice in West Woodstock.

Stoddard was elected as a Democratic-Republican to the Seventeenth Congress and reelected as an Adams-Clay Republican candidate to the Eighteenth Congress (March 4, 1821 – March 3, 1825). After leaving Congress, he sat in the Connecticut Senate in 1825–1827. He was the 33rd and 35th lieutenant governor of the state in 1833 and 1835–1837. He continued to practice law before dying in West Woodstock in 1847. He was buried in Bungay Cemetery.

External links

 

1785 births
1847 deaths
Lieutenant Governors of Connecticut
Brown University alumni
Connecticut state senators
Democratic-Republican Party members of the United States House of Representatives from Connecticut
19th-century American politicians
People from Union, Connecticut
People from Woodstock, Connecticut